The Kwik-E-Mart (spelled "Quick-E-Mart" in "Bart the General") is a convenience store in the animated television series The Simpsons.

It is a parody of American convenience stores, such as 7-Eleven and Cumberland Farms, and depicts many of the stereotypes about them. It is notorious for its high prices and the poor quality of its merchandise.

It is run by an Indian-American named Apu Nahasapeemapetilon. It first appeared in the 1990 episode "The Telltale Head" and has since become a common setting in The Simpsons. The Simpsons family are regular customers.

In July 2007, eleven 7-Eleven locations in the United States and one in Canada were transformed into Kwik-E-Marts as part of a special promotion for The Simpsons Movie. Also in 2007, gift shops modeled after the "Kwik-E-Marts" were opened in Universal Studios Florida and Universal Studios Hollywood, where they are a companion to  "The Simpsons Ride".

Role in The Simpsons
In The Simpsons the Kwik-E-Mart is a convenience store that sells the usual fare at extraordinarily high prices, including the always popular Squishee. The backstory is that the Kwik-E-Mart chain was started somewhere in the North Pole. In The Simpsons the Kwik-E-Mart is operated by an Indian American character named Apu Nahasapeemapetilon, who mans the store with his brother Sanjay and is a caricature of the stereotypical "foreign born" convenience store clerk.  Apu proudly gouges customers and sells tainted merchandise, such as rotten meat or expired milk. The Kwik-E-Mart is quite often the target of robbers, leading to Apu having been shot on several occasions and as a result having almost missed work. On one occasion Marge Simpson mentioned that because of the frequency of shootings, it is only a $100 fine.

Real-world versions

7-Eleven promotion

In July 2007, convenience store chain 7-Eleven converted 11 of its stores in the United States and one in Canada (Coquitlam) into Kwik-E-Marts to promote The Simpsons Movie. The concept was first visualized in 2006 by Fox's advertising agency, and the approximately 10 million dollar (US) cost of the promotion was borne by 7-Eleven.  Another part of the promotion was a contest where customers who purchased a slurpee or sandwich also received a coded game piece that could be entered into a website.  The grand prize of the contest was to be animated into an episode of The Simpsons.  Prior to July, the promotion had long been known but the locations were kept a secret until the morning of July 1, when the 12 stores were made over with industrial foam, vinyl and Kwik-E-Mart signs.

These 12 locations, as well as the majority of other North American 7-Elevens, sold products found in The Simpsons, such as "Buzz Cola", "Krusty-O's", "Squishees", pink frosted "Sprinklicious doughnuts" and other Simpsons-themed merchandise. The Squishees were Slurpees that are sold in special collector cups and the Krusty-O's were made by Malt-O-Meal. Several other 7-Eleven items, such as sandwiches, were sold in Simpsons-themed packaging. It was decided that Duff Beer would not be sold due to the movie being rated PG-13, and the promoters wanted to have "good, responsible fun," though it was noted that it was a tough decision.  However, a Duff Energy Drink was released in place of the Duff Beer.

The promotion resulted in a 30% increase in profits for the changed 7-Eleven stores. Many of the stores sold out of their special Simpsons products within a few days of the start of the promotion. The conversions lasted through early August, when the stores were converted back to 7-Elevens.

There was a mild controversy when the promotion offended members of the Indian-American community who felt that Apu is a caricature that plays on too many negative stereotypes. Despite this, 7-Eleven reported that many of its Indian employees have reacted positively to the idea, although it was noted that it was "not a 100 percent endorsement."

Universal Studios

On October 17, 2007, a gift shop that was modeled after a Kwik-E-Mart was opened at Universal Studios Florida. One also opened at Universal Studios Hollywood at a later time. They replaced the old Back to the Future gift shop and supplement The Simpsons Ride, which opened in Spring 2008. The stores sell  Simpsons-related merchandise like Flaming Moe's Energy Drinks and Squishees.

Broadway At The Beach 
On August 17, 2018, a gift shop modeled after a Kwik-E-Mart opened at Broadway at the Beach in Myrtle Beach, South Carolina. The gift shop is placed at the exit of a 4D ride based on The Simpsons and is housed in a replica of The Aztec theatre from the series, which opened in 2019. The store sells Buzz Cola, Lard Lad Donuts, and Squishees along with merchandise from the show.

References

Bibliography

External links
Apu's profile at TheSimpsons.com

Fictional shops
The Simpsons locations
7-Eleven
Fictional elements introduced in 1990

it:Luoghi de I Simpson#Jet Market
fi:Apu Nahasapeemapetilon#Kwik-E-Mart